NPAS3 or Neuronal PAS domain protein 3 is a brain-enriched transcription factor belonging to the bHLH-PAS superfamily of transcription factors, the members of which carry out diverse functions, including circadian oscillations, neurogenesis, toxin metabolism, hypoxia, and tracheal development. NPAS3 contains basic helix-loop-helix structural motif and PAS domain, like the other proteins in the superfamily.

Function 

NPAS3 is also known as human accelerated region 21.  It may, therefore, have played a key role in differentiating humans from apes.

NPAS1 and NPAS3-deficient mice display behavioral abnormalities typical to the animal models of schizophrenia.

According to the same study, NPAS1 and NPAS3 disruption leads to reduced expression of reelin, which is also consistently found to be reduced in the brains of human patients with schizophrenia and psychotic bipolar disorder. Among the 49 genomic regions that undergone rapid changes in humans compared with their evolutionary ancestors, NPAS3 was found to be located in the region 21.

Clinical significance 

Disruption of NPAS3 was found in one family affected by schizophrenia and NPAS3 gene is thought to be associated with psychiatric illness and learning disability. In a genetic study of several hundred subjects conducted in 2008, interacting haplotypes at the NPAS3 locus were found to affect the risk of schizophrenia and bipolar disorder.

In a pharmacogenetical study, polymorphisms in NPAS3 gene were highly associated with response to iloperidone, a proposed atypical antipsychotic.

References

Further reading 

 
 
 
 
 
 
 

PAS-domain-containing proteins
g1
Biology of bipolar disorder